Sir Hugh le Despenser (died 1238) was a wealthy landowner in the East Midlands of England, and served as High Sheriff of Berkshire. Among his descendants were the infamous Despensers who became favourites of King Edward II.

Origins
He was the son of Thomas Despencer and Rohese de Foix, daughter of Roger-Bernard I, Count of Foix. He had siblings including Thomas Despencer (d.pre-October 1218), and Rohaise Despencer, who married Stephen de Segrave.

Career
He served as Sheriff of Staffordshire and Sheriff of Shropshire in 1222 and as Sheriff of Berkshire in 1226 and 1238. He held eleven manors in England, in the counties of Leicestershire, Yorkshire, Lincolnshire, and Rutland. He is reported to have been instrumental in the repairs made in 1232 to Porchester Castle in Hampshire, including a new forebuilding to the keep and portcullises for the gatehouses, with repairs to the wall and great hall.

Marriage and issue
He is believed to have married Mary de Quincy, a daughter of Saer de Quincy, 1st Earl of Winchester (d.1219) by his wife Margaret de Beaumont (d.1234). By his wife he had at least three children: 
Hugh le Despencer, 1st Baron le Despencer (died 1265), a supporter of Simon de Montfort, with whom he died at the Battle of Evesham, opposing King Henry III.
Pernell le Despencer, who married Geoffrey Savage; 
Mary le Despencer, who married Roger St John.

Year of birth missing
1238 deaths
Anglo-Normans
High Sheriffs of Berkshire
High Sheriffs of Staffordshire
High Sheriffs of Shropshire
Hugh
English feudal barons